San Carlos City Airport (Filipino: Paliparan ng Lungsod ng San Carlos, Hiligaynon: Hulugpaan sang Dakbanwa sang San Carlos, Cebuano: Tugpahanan sa Dakbayan sa San Carlos), is community airport serving the general area of the city of San Carlos, Negros Occidental, and the surrounding areas in the Philippines.

Current development
It is used exclusively for cargo, though there are currently no commercial flights, serving occasional chartered planes to nearby Toledo, Cebu and the resort island of Refugio (Sipaway). While serviceable, the runway and other airport facilities are still under development, with maintenance shouldered by the City Government of San Carlos.

References

Airports in the Philippines
Airport
Transportation in the Visayas